Lakeview Islands a neighborhood in southeastern Lexington, Kentucky, United States. The lakes of City Reservoirs 2 and 3 are to its North, West and South. New Circle Road forms its Eastern boundary.

Neighborhood statistics
 Area: 
 Population: 249
 Population density: 2,013 people per square mile
 Median household income (2010): $132,209

References

Neighborhoods in Lexington, Kentucky